Pakistan International Airlines Corporation commonly known as Pakistan International Airlines or PIA is the flag carrier airline of Pakistan. The airline, with its head office on the grounds of Jinnah International Airport in Karachi. Its main bases are Karachi, Lahore and Islamabad/Rawalpindi.

Pakistan International Airlines was set up on 1 March 1955, after Orient Airways merged with the government's proposed new airline. During the same year the airline opened its first international service, from Karachi to London Heathrow Airport via Cairo International Airport and Leonardo da Vinci Airport in Fiumicino, Italy, using three newly acquired Lockheed L-1049C Super Constellations. The DC-3s continued operating the domestic services in Pakistan. In May 1956, PIA ordered two further Super Lockheed Constellations of the latest L-1049H version and five Vickers Viscount 815.

PIA currently operates to 19 domestic and 23 international destinations in 14 countries across Asia, Europe and North America as of June 2020.

List

Until 1971 PIA also served various places as domestic stations in what was East Pakistan. During the coronavirus pandemic in 2020, the PIA operated a series of chartered flights to and from Australia, South Africa, South Korea, UK and the Middle East among others to transport stranded citizens. On 30 June 2020, the European Air Safety Agency banned PIA from operating in Europe for 6 months.

References 

Lists of airline destinations
Destinations